Savile's bandicoot rat (Bandicota savilei) is a species of rodent in the family Muridae found in Myanmar, Thailand, and Vietnam.

References

Bandicota
Rats of Asia
Rodents of Southeast Asia
Mammals described in 1916
Taxa named by Oldfield Thomas
Taxonomy articles created by Polbot